Cossogno (Lombard: Cussögn) is a comune (municipality) in the Province of Verbano-Cusio-Ossola in the Italian region Piedmont, located about  northeast of Turin and about  north of Verbania.

Cossogno borders the following municipalities: Malesco, Miazzina, Premosello-Chiovenda, San Bernardino Verbano, Trontano, Valle  Cannobina, Verbania. Part of its territory is included in the Val Grande National Park.

References

Cities and towns in Piedmont